Exxon Corp. v. Governor of Maryland, 437 U.S. 117 (1978), was a case in which the Supreme Court of the United States upheld a Maryland law prohibiting oil producers and refiners from operating service stations within its borders. The challengers, including Exxon, claimed that the law violated the Dormant Commerce Clause. Justice Stevens wrote for the majority, which disagreed with Exxon et al.: "Since Maryland's entire gasoline supply flows in interstate commerce and since there are no local producers or refiners, such claims of disparate treatment between interstate and local commerce would be meritless." Exxon challenged the Maryland statute in Circuit Court which ruled the statute invalid. The Maryland Court of Appeals reversed the ruling.

Background
Maryland found that companies controlling both the production and distribution of oil were receiving preferential treatment from oil refineries through favorable purchasing rates. To combat this type of business, Maryland passed a law that prohibited producers or refiners from operating gasoline stations in Maryland, and required producers and refiners extend temporary price cuts to the stations they supplied.

Questions before the Court
(1) Does Maryland's statute prohibiting the control of both the production and distribution of oil violate the Due Process and Commerce Clauses of the Constitution?

(2) Does Maryland's statute conflict with the Robinson-Patman Act?

The Decision of the Court

In a 7-1 decision in favor of the defendant, Justice Stevens wrote for the majority. The Court held that the statute passed by Maryland does not (1) discriminate against interstate dealers (2) prohibit the flow of interstate goods (3) place added cost on them (4) or distinguish between in-state or out-of-state retailers. The absence of any of these factors fully distinguishes this case from Hunt v. Washington Apple Commission. The Court held that the regulation was constitutional despite huge extraterritorial effects of the regulation, less burdensome options available to the state, and no legitimate state interest apart from a desire for cheaper oil. This case is an exception to the rules set forth in Pike v. Bruce Church, Inc.. Justice Blackmun, with the only vote in favor of Exxon, wrote the dissenting opinion for the court.

See also
 List of United States Supreme Court cases, volume 437

References

External links
 

United States Constitution Article One case law
United States Supreme Court cases
United States Dormant Commerce Clause case law
1978 in United States case law
United States energy case law
ExxonMobil litigation
Legal history of Maryland
United States Supreme Court cases of the Burger Court
Energy in Maryland